The Samenwerkende Hulporganisaties (Dutch for Cooperating Aid Organizations) is a cooperative effort of aid organizations. The organizations work together to give humanitarian aid to people in disaster areas. The SHO cooperatively collects donations and informs to the public.

Campaigns
The SHO has had campaigns for

 Iraq
 The Bam earthquake
 The War in Darfur
 The 2004 Indian Ocean earthquake
 The 2005 Kashmir earthquake
 Cyclone Nargis
 The 2010 Haiti earthquake
 The 2010 Pakistan floods
 The 2011 Horn of Africa drought.
 The Syrian civil war
 Typhoon Haiyan
 The Western African Ebola virus epidemic
 The 2015 Nepal earthquake
 The 2017 famine in South Sudan, Yemen, and in Northeast Nigeria, as well as the Somali drought
 The 2018 Sulawesi earthquake and tsunami
 The 2020 Beirut explosion
 The COVID-19 pandemic in India, Nepal, Yemen, Afghanistan, Malawi, Palestine, Suriname, Zambia, Uganda, Syria, Bangladesh, Pakistan, the Philippines, and Nigeria.
 The 2022 Russian invasion of Ukraine
 The 2023 Turkey–Syria earthquake

Participants
The participating organizations are:
 ICCO & Kerk in Actie (Church in Action) 
 Mensen in Nood / Cordaid (People in Need) 
 Dutch Red Cross
 Oxfam Novib
 Stichting Vluchteling (Refugee Foundation) 
 Tear Fund
 Terre des Hommes
 Unicef
 World Vision
 Save the Children

References

External links
website SHO

Charities based in the Netherlands
Non-profit organisations based in the Netherlands